Wilson Tucker may refer to:

 Wilson Tucker (politician) (born 1984), Australian politician
 Wilson Tucker (writer) (1914–2006), American science fiction writer